In the 1877 Iowa State Senate elections, Iowa voters elected state senators to serve in the seventeenth Iowa General Assembly. Elections were held in 24 of the state senate's 50 districts. State senators serve four-year terms in the Iowa State Senate.

The general election took place on October 9, 1877.

Following the previous election, Republicans had control of the Iowa Senate with 40 seats to Democrats' 10 seats.

To claim control of the chamber from Republicans, the Democrats needed to net 16 Senate seats.

Republicans maintained control of the Iowa State Senate following the 1877 general election with the balance of power shifting to Republicans holding 38 seats and Democrats having 12 seats (a net gain of 2 seats for Democrats).

Summary of Results
Note: Redistricting occurred before the 1877 general election. Any holdover Senators not up for re-election and whose district numbers did not change are unlisted on this table.

Source:

Detailed Results
NOTE: The Iowa Official Register does not contain detailed vote totals for state senate elections in 1877.

See also
 Elections in Iowa

External links
District boundaries in the Iowa Senate were redrawn before the 1877 general election.
Iowa Senate Districts 1874-1877 map
Iowa Senate Districts 1878-1883 map

References

Iowa Senate
Iowa
Iowa Senate elections